Lutz  is an unincorporated census-designated place (CDP) in Hillsborough County, Florida, United States,  north of Tampa. The northern part of Lutz also makes up a portion of south Pasco County. The population was 23,707 according to the 2020 Census.

History
Lutz began with the construction of a small train depot on the Tampa Northern Railroad. The area surrounding the depot officially became known as "Lutz" when the U.S. Postal Service authorized a post office. The community was named for W. P. Lutz, who was credited with bringing the railroad to town.

As people moved to the rural community from Tampa, the Lutz area continued to grow until it no longer depended on the "Lutz Junction", which was demolished in the late 1960s.

In 2000, a replica of the depot was rebuilt in the approximate location, which is now at the intersection of Lutz-Lake Fern Road and U.S. Highway 41. The post office's structure is still in the same place today, although it is now an art gallery. A public library is located behind the train depot replica. This area is known as "Beautiful Downtown Lutz".

Part of the movie Edward Scissorhands was filmed on Tinsmith Circle in the neighborhood of Carpenter's Run in north Lutz in Pasco County. In the credits the town is named in the "Thank you" section.

Geography
Lutz is located in northwestern Hillsborough County at  (28.139428, -82.462028). It is bordered to the east by the city of Tampa, to the south by the Lake Magdalene and University unincorporated communities, and to the west by unincorporated Northdale and Cheval, all in Hillsborough County. To the north, Lutz is bordered by Land o' Lakes and Wesley Chapel in Pasco County.

Interstate 275 runs through the east side of Lutz, joining its parent highway Interstate 75 in the northeast corner of the community. U.S. Route 41 runs through the center of Lutz, and Florida State 597 forms part of the western border.

ZIP codes
ZIP codes which serve Lutz and the surrounding areas are 33548, 33549, 33558 and 33559. These ZIP codes extend north past the Hillsborough County line to State Road 54 in unincorporated southern Pasco County. That area is also called Lutz, and often referred to as "Pasco Lutz" by residents and newspapers.

Demographics

As of the 2020 census, Lutz had a population of 23,707 with 8,584 households. 

By age, the population was split as follows: 4.7% of the population were under 5 years old, 23.1% were under 18 years old, and 18.7% were 65 years and older. 50.3% of the population were female. 

77.6% were white, 5.4% were black or African American, 0.1% were American Indian and Alaska Native, 6.3% were Asian, 9.3% were two or more races, and 14.4% were Hispanic or Latino. 

There were 1,700 veterans living in the CDP and 10.2% of the population were Foreign born persons. 

97.0% of the households had a computer and 94.9% of the households had a broadband internet subscription. 

Of the population aged 25 years or older, 97.0% had a high school diploma or higher and 49.5% of that same population had a Bachelor's degree or higher. 

Of the population under 65 years old, 6.6% lived with a disability and 7.7% of that same population did not have health insurance. 

The median household income was $91,875 with a per capita income of $46,908. 3.8% of the population lived below the poverty threshold.

Schools
Lutz is served by Hillsborough & Pasco County Public Schools through the following:
Schwarzkopf Elementary School
Lutz K-8
Mckitrick Elementary School
Bexley Elementary School
Miles Elementary School
Buchanan Middle School
Martinez Middle School
Walker Middle School
Ben Hill K-8
Maniscalco K-8
Freedom High School
Gaither High School
Steinbrenner High School
Sickles High School
Sunlake High School

References

External links
Lutz Civic Association
History of Lutz

Census-designated places in Hillsborough County, Florida
Census-designated places in Florida